Androcles is a legendary Roman slave.

Androcles may also refer to:

 Androcles (politician) (fl. ca. 415 BCE), opposed to Alcibiades at time of the Sicilian Expedition
 Androclus, legendary founder of the Greek city of Ephesus in Asia Minor
 Androcles, Messenian leader in the Second Messenian War